88rising (stylized as 88⬆), formerly known as CXSHXNLY (pronounced “cash only”), is an American music company that founder Sean Miyashiro describes as a "hybrid management, record label, video production, and marketing company".

The company has gained popularity as a musical platform and record label primarily for Asian American and Asian artists who release music in the United States, such as Joji, Keith Ape, Rich Brian, and Niki. Miyashiro states 88rising is "The Disney of Asian hip-hop". Miyashiro also hopes 88rising can bridge the gap between Asian and American music. The New Yorker writes about 88rising, "With artists like Joji, Rich Brian and Higher Brothers, Sean Miyashiro's company is an authority on how to create pop-culture crossovers." "Asian rap collective 88rising has quickly become one of the most popular, and groundbreaking, crews in music.", says Rolling Stone. A Paper article stated that "88rising provides not only the cultural support, but also the strategic and technical know-how to help emerging Asian artists cross over in an efficient but meaningful way." In 2019, 88rising was awarded Label of the Year by Netease, one of the largest music streaming platforms in China.

Headquartered in New York City, the company also has offices in Los Angeles and Shanghai. Outside of its core group, the company has collaborated with many artists, most notably KOHH, CL, DPR Live, Yaeji, Phum Viphurit, Verbal, and Hikaru Utada.

History 
88rising was founded in 2015 by Sean Miyashiro and Jaeson Ma The company first started as a music collective and management company called CXSHXNLY (pronounced "cash only") which oversees and began to make contact with up-and-coming artists that they found on the internet. The company's inaugural artists include Brian Puspos, Dumbfoundead, Josh Pan, and Okasian. Miyashiro said that their music collective goal is "to become the most wavy, iconic crew" and "trying to represent for not only Asian immigrants, but for all immigrants". A few months later, Dumbfoundead showed Miyashiro the music video of Keith Ape's single titled "It G Ma", Miyashiro began to work with both artists to release the remix version of the single which features A$AP Ferg, Father, and Waka Flocka Flame. The single was released on July 27, 2015 by OWSLA and the music video was premiered by Complex.

In May 2016, the company uploaded their first video content on YouTube as 88rising and began to work with other artists such as Rich Brian, Joji, and Higher Brothers. The name is derived from eighty-eight translating to double happiness in Chinese.

A year later in May 2017, the label made a live performance as a collective at the Boiler Room in Los Angeles with Rich Brian, Joji, and Keith Ape all making appearances and performing at a mansion party in Beverly Hills. The Higher Brothers performed via live stream from their hometown in Chengdu, as they could not travel to the United States at the time. Several guests such as Yaeji and Ronny J also performed with the label. In November 2017, 88rising announced a tour across Asia featuring Rich Brian, Joji, and Higher Brothers with Keith Ape occasionally performing at select shows. The tour took place in nine major Asian cities: Seoul, Beijing, Shanghai, Chengdu, Bangkok, Singapore, Kuala Lumpur, Manila, and Jakarta.

In May 2017, WPP plc, one of the world's largest advertising companies, announced that they had invested in 88rising.

In February 2018, 88rising presented its inaugural North American tour at The Warfield Theatre in San Francisco, The Shrine Expo Hall in Los Angeles, and Terminal 5 in New York City. The sold-out tour featured Rich Brian, Joji, Keith Ape with surprise guest appearances from other artists such as Charli XCX and Ski Mask the Slump God. The label also saw the debut studio releases from many of 88rising's flagship artists. On February 2, 2018, Rich Brian's released his debut album Amen to generally positive reviews and commercial acclaim, charting at No. 18 on the Billboard 200 in its first week. The album also made iTunes history by being the first album released by an Asian artist to top the iTunes Hip-Hop Chart. On July 20, 2018, 88rising released their first compilation album titled Head in the Clouds. The album contains 17 compilation tracks – including the RIAA-certified Gold record "Midsummer Madness" and featuring its label core roster and guest appearances from other artists including GoldLink, Playboi Carti, BlocBoy JB, 03 Greedo, and Verbal. On October 26, 2018, Joji released his debut album Ballads 1, which includes the RIAA-certified Platinum single "Slow Dancing in the Dark" and Gold single "Yeah Right". The album made Billboard chart history as the first album by a solo Asian artist to top the Billboard R&B / Hip-Hop charts. 88rising presented its first Head in the Clouds Festival on September 22, 2018 at the Los Angeles State Historic Park. The festival's lineup included a roster of hip-hop and R&B acts from both the United States and Asia including Rich Brian, Joji, Keith Ape, Niki, Higher Brothers, Dumbfoundead and more. The festival also hosted the debut United States performance for Japanese rapper Kohh. In its recap of the festival, Billboard called Head in The Clouds "the Asian Festival You Need To Know". The festival was followed by the 88 Degrees and Rising tour in Fall 2018, which featured a lineup including the label's roster alongside Sen Morimoto and Kohh.

In 2019, 88rising saw a sophomore studio releases from artists Higher Brothers and Rich Brian. On February 22, 2019, Higher Brothers released Five Stars, as their follow-up to their debut studio album Black Cab. The album featured many prominent hip-hop collaborators, including Schoolboy Q, JID, Denzel Curry, Ski Mask The Slump God, Soulja Boy and more. Five Stars became the top album on Chinese streaming platform Netease in Q1 of 2019 and the Higher Brothers were crowned Hip-Hop Artist of the Year. Netease also bestowed 88rising the Label of the Year award. On July 26, Rich Brian released his second studio album, The Sailor, which was primarily produced by Bekon and The Donuts and featured guest appearances from RZA, Joji and more. On July 17, 2019, Billboard announced the 2nd annual Head in the Clouds music festival for Saturday, August 17, 2019 at Los Angeles State Historic Park with an additional dance music stage and an expanded lineup of music artists. Californian food festival 626 Night Market curated the food vendors. The second festival saw the North American festival debut of K-Pop group iKon as well as performances by Joji, Rich Brian, Higher Brothers, NIKI, DPR Live and many more. The festival was dubbed by Rolling Stone and Los Angeles Magazine as the "Asian Coachella". The label also released their second compilation album, Head in the Clouds II, on October 11, 2019, which featured artists including Swae Lee of Rae Sremmurd, Jackson Wang, Phum Viphurit, Chungha and many more. A duet from the album, "I Love You 3000 II" by Stephanie Poetri and Wang, quickly topped the Billboard China Social Chart.

Many live events were canceled in 2020 due to the COVID-19 pandemic. Another Head in the Clouds festival was originally planned in March 2020 in Jakarta, but was eventually canceled due to the pandemic. Thus, 88rising held its Asia Rising Forever festival, an online concert featuring Asia talent from around the world streamed on their YouTube and Twitter accounts, on May 6. On December 3, 2020, 88rising launched a 24-hour radio channel on Sirius XM featuring music from Asian artists. Another online live stream festival under the name Double Happiness, in reference to their slogan "88 is double happiness" was also launched the same day with performances from Anderson .Paak and Knxwledge from their musical duo, Nxworries, as well as others such as Audrey Nuna and Ylona Garcia

In 2021, 88rising released Shang-Chi and the Legend of the Ten Rings: The Album for the Marvel film Shang-Chi and the Legend of the Ten Rings.''

In April 2022, 88rising performed at Coachella with a showcase titled Head in the Clouds Forever, including performances by CL, 2NE1, Hikaru Utada, Jackson Wang, Rich Brian, Bibi, Niki, Milli and Warren Hue. They also released a single of the same name including three tracks featuring Bibi, Utada, Hue and Rich Brian.

Artists

Current

 Atarashii Gakko!
 Bibi
 Chungha
 Dumbfoundead
 Guapdad 4000
 Higher Brothers
 Jackson Wang
 Joji
 Keith Ape
 Lexie Liu
 Milli
 Niki
 Rich Brian
 Seori
 Stephanie Poetri
 Warren Hue
 Ylona Garcia

Former

August 08
Brian Puspos
Okasian
Rina Sawayama

Discography

Studio albums

Compilation albums

Extended plays

References

External links 
 

American record labels
Mass media companies of the United States
Mass media companies established in 2015
American companies established in 2015
Record labels established in 2015
American independent record labels